Elections to Winchester City Council took place on 6 May 2021 as part of the 2021 United Kingdom local elections. This took place at the same time as the elections for Hampshire County Council and the Hampshire Police and Crime Commissioner.

Background 
Whilst an election for the County Council had already been planned, District Council Elections were delayed due to the ongoing COVID-19 pandemic, meaning that they are due to be held at the same time as the Hampshire County Council Elections.

After the previous elections, the Liberal Democrats took control of the council from the Conservative Party, with the Liberal Democrats holding 27 seats of the 23 required for a majority, and the Conservatives holding the remaining 18. The Liberal Democrats had last been in control of the council between 2010 and 2011, with the council under either Conservative administration or no overall control since then.

Subsequent to the 2019 election, two Conservative Councillors left the party and a further was suspended, whilst a Liberal Democrat councillor resigned, leaving a vacancy. As such, prior to the 2021 election, the Liberal Democrats held 26 seats, the Conservatives 15, and three councillors sat as independents.

The Count for these elections took place on Saturday, 8 May 2021, and results were published by the Council.

Results summary

Results

Alresford & Itchen Valley

Badger Farm & Oliver's Battery

Bishops Waltham

Central Meon Valley

Denmead

Southwick & Wickham

St Barnabas

St Bartholomew

St Luke

St Michael

St Paul

The Worthys

Whiteley & Shedfield

Wonston & Micheldever

References 

Winchester
2021
2020s in Hampshire
May 2021 events in the United Kingdom